Pandarampatti is a village in Thoothukudi District of Tamil Nadu, India. It has a population of around 2000. In the early days agriculture was the mainstay economy, but due to the industrialization of Tuticorin people go to  work in Tuticorin Port and other industries around the town.

Geography 

Pandarampatti is located 7 km from Tuticorin, it is  8 km from the Bay of Bengal.

Common Agricultural Crops 
 Maize
 Tomato
 Chilly
 Kodo Mille
 Blackgram
 Bulrush / Spiked Millet
 Greengram

External links
About Tamilnadu other places

Villages in Thoothukudi district